is the thirty-second single by Japanese singer Mika Nakashima. Released on August 25, 2010, it was the theme song for the TBS TV series, . Nakashima played the supporting role of Rie Hagurashi in the TV series.

This song has been noted for its "old-sounding" tune reminiscent of 20th-century Japanese pop songs, such as Teresa Teng's; J-pop hit songs have mostly been under the strong influence of electronic elements from the likes of synthpop, techno, hip hop and Eurobeat since the 1990s.

Track listing

Charts

Oricon Sales Chart (Japan)

"Ichiban Kirei na Watashi o" was certified platinum for Chaku-Uta Full sales of over 250,000.

Usen Chart (Japan)
It reached the top spot of the Usen Chart and stayed there for five consecutive weeks.

References

2010 singles
Mika Nakashima songs
Japanese television drama theme songs
2010 songs
Songs written by Katsuhiko Sugiyama